Talin Sona Movsesian (born ) is an American executive assistant, author, and media personality. She has been the personal assistant of late-night talk show host Conan O'Brien since 2009, and has been featured in show segments, including as a guest in 2019. Movsesian has co-hosted the podcast Conan O'Brien Needs a Friend since 2018. In 2022, she released a humorous how-to book titled The World's Worst Assistant, which became a New York Times Best Seller.

Early life
Talin Sona Movsesian was born on October 13, 1982 in Montebello, California to an Armenian family, and grew up in Hacienda Heights, California where she attended the Armenian Mesrobian School. After transferring out of Mt. San Antonio College, Movsesian graduated from the University of Southern California in 2005 with a degree in communication.

Career
Movsesian worked at NBC initially as a page and Events and Operations Coordinator. She became O'Brien's assistant in 2009 while he was hosting The Tonight Show with Conan O'Brien. Movsesian has appeared in several episodes of Conan and The Tonight Show and features prominently in the 2011 documentary Conan O'Brien Can't Stop. In 2015, she appeared alongside O'Brien in the television special Conan in Armenia which revolved around O'Brien taking his assistant to Armenia to connect with her heritage. Movsesian and O'Brien's relationship has been described as atypical for a boss and his assistant, with Movsesian reveling in goofing off. This playful laziness and dysfunctional dynamic was often a source of comedy in Movsesian's appearances on the show, and on the podcast. Movsesian said, "He saw something in me that was valuable in a different way besides someone who was the perfect assistant, and that was someone who would screw up and give him fodder for comedy. Sometimes for comedians, that's so much more valuable."

In 2018, Movsesian began co-hosting the podcast Conan O'Brien Needs a Friend alongside O'Brien and podcaster Matt Gourley.

On July 11, 2019, O'Brien interviewed Movsesian on Conan after scheduled guest Kumail Nanjiani had to cancel at the last minute.

She also voices the character of Princess Sugar Salt, a character in Power Players - an American French cartoon.

On June 18, 2021, Movsesian announced she was writing a book titled The World's Worst Assistant, a humorous how-to guide. The book was released on July 19, 2022, and includes a foreword written by Conan O'Brien. It was a New York Times Best Seller, debuting at number six in the category of "Advice, How-To & Miscellaneous".

Personal life
Movsesian married graphic artist Tak Boroyan in 2018. She is an Armenian Orthodox Christian, and was married at Holy Cross Apostolic Cathedral in Montebello, California. She announced on the February 15, 2021 episode of Conan O'Brien Needs a Friend that the couple was expecting twin boys. She posted on her Instagram account stating she gave birth on July 1, 2021, to her two sons Mikey, and Charlie, one week after Conan’s final show. The family also includes a dog named Oki.

References

External links

Living people
American people of Armenian descent
People from Los Angeles
University of Southern California alumni
Conan O'Brien
People from Montebello, California
Year of birth missing (living people)